UNITAS Gold was the 50th iteration of UNITAS, which began in 1959 and is the longest-running multilateral  maritime exercise.   The 2009 exercises included 25 ships and 70 aircraft from 12 nations and was the 50th time the operation was conducted.

Rear Admiral Joseph D. Kernan, then-Commander, U.S. Fourth Fleet and U.S. Naval Forces Southern Command, remarked that UNITAS helps "nations coordinate efforts to oppose the scourge" of piracy.

References

Military exercises involving the United States
United States Navy in the 21st century
Military exercises and wargames
Foreign relations of the United States